Dorset Square is a garden square in Marylebone, London.  All buildings fronting it are terraced houses and listed, in the mainstream (initial) category. It takes up the site of Lord's (MCC's) Old Cricket Ground, which lasted 23 years until the 1811 season.  Internally it spans .

Location

Approach ways
It is one 84-metre block north of Marylebone Road and lends its name to the roads on all four sides, in typical fashion — the east side forms a pause in the numbering and scope of Gloucester Place; the west does so as to Balcombe Street. The south side links:
to the west Melcombe Place which behind the square's largest house/building (№s 26 to 28, known as 28) to the west fronts the ticket hall (with food, drink and supermarket outlets) of Marylebone station (formerly Harewood Square) and the Landmark Hotel.
to the east Melcombe Street (formerly New Street) which ends two main blocks away at Baker Street.

Site history
Dorset Square takes up (1787-founded) Lord's Old Ground the closure of which at the end of 1810's season was brought about by a sought rent increase.

Buildings

Dorset Square Hotel, created in 1985, can be found on the south side of the square, at 39-40 Dorset Square 

All sides (east, №s1-8; north №s9-20; west №s21-28; south №s29-40) are Grade II listed buildings. The Embassy of El Salvador is at № 8. № 1 currently houses the London branch of Alliance Française but during WWII functioned as its international headquarters when the original in Paris was closed. A plaque by the front door commemorates the building's history as the site from which agents of the French Resistance were equipped for, and dispatched to, undercover missions in Occupied France.

Notable residents
In birth order:
George Saxby Penfold (1770–1846), a popular preacher, lived at № 15 
Robert Fellowes (1771–1847), cleric, journalist and philanthropist
Thomas Duer Broughton (1778–1835), army officer and writer on India
Jeanette Pickersgill (c1814-1885), the first person to be legally cremated in the UK
George Grossmith (1847–1912), comedian, writer, composer, actor, and singer (№ 28)
Bithia Mary Croker (c. 1848–1920), Irish-born novelist, died at № 30.
Sir Laurence Gomme (1853–1916), folklorist (№ 24)
Dodie Smith (1896–1990), novelist and playwright (№ 18)
Jane Ridley (born 1953), historian, biographer and broadcaster (№ 31)

References

Marylebone
Squares in the City of Westminster
Streets in the City of Westminster
Communal gardens
Garden squares in London